Lake of the Woods a lake occupying parts of the Canadian provinces of Ontario and Manitoba and the U.S. state of Minnesota.

Lake of the Woods may also refer to:

Lakes
 Lake of the Woods (California)
 Lake of the Woods (Indiana)
 Lake of the Woods (New York)
 Lake of the Woods (Oregon)
 Lake of the Woods (Wyoming)

Places
 Lake of the Woods, California
 Lake of the Woods, Illinois
 Lake of the Woods, Peoria County, Illinois
 Lake of the Woods County, Minnesota
 Lake of the Woods, Oregon
 Lake of the Woods, Ontario
 Lake of the Woods 31B, Ontario
 Lake of the Woods 31C, Ontario
 Lake of the Woods 31G, Ontario
 Lake of the Woods 31H, Ontario
 Lake of the Woods 34, Ontario
 Lake of the Woods 35J, Ontario
 Lake of the Woods 37, Ontario
 Lake of the Woods 37B, Ontario
 Lake of the Woods, Virginia

Other
 Lake of the Woods School, Baudette, Minnesota
 The English translation of most of the names of the Concordia Language Villages

See also
 In the Lake of the Woods, a novel by Tim O'Brien
 Lake Woods